As of July 2022, Rhode Island has a single semi-professional sports team, the Providence Bruins.

Notable sports teams

References

Sports in Rhode Island
Rhode Island
Professional